Yoshimi (born  on February 18, 1968) is a Japanese musician best known for her role as the longest consistent drummer in the Japanese rock band Boredoms.

Alongside her drum playing skills with Boredoms, she performs the vocals for the all female group OOIOO and also plays trumpet, guitar and keyboards as well.

Born in Okayama, Japan, Yoshimi joined her first band, U.F.O. or Die, with EYE in 1986. Since 1997, she has led the all-female band OOIOO and continues to contribute to the current incarnation of Boredoms.

Yoshimi has worked on many other projects, most notably a raga band called Saicobab, an ambient project called Yoshimi and Yuka, the tribal-drum-influenced OLAibi, and indie supergroup Free Kitten. She appeared as a session player and vocalist on the Flaming Lips' 2002 album Yoshimi Battles the Pink Robots. Yoshimi participated as drummer one in the Boredoms 77 Boadrum performance, which occurred on July 7, 2007, at the Empire-Fulton Ferry State Park in Brooklyn, New York.

Wayne Coyne of The Flaming Lips said that their album Yoshimi Battles The Pink Robots was inspired by Yoshimi. He called her "one of those strange genius musicians."

Reception
Yoshimi was featured on the cover of the July 2014 issue of WIRE magazine, and in a feature article by James Hadfield. Pitchfork covered her and her band OOIOO in a feature article in 2020. Modern Drummer magazine carried a feature article on Yoshimi written by John Colpitts. In 2016, Emi Kariya interviewed Yoshimi and Ikue Mori for Tom Tom Magazine.

Discography

Yoshimio
Big Toast (1993)
2 (1994)
3 (1995)
Yunnan Colorfree (2007)
Bor-Cozmik (2009)

Yoshimi and Yuka

 Flower with No Color (2003)

OOIOO

OOIOO (1997)
Feather Float (1999)
Gold and Green (2000)
Kila Kila Kila (2003)
Taiga (2006)
OOEYヨOO -EYヨ REMIX (Eye Remix EP) (2007)
COCOCOOOIOO: The Best of Shock City 1997–2001
Armonico Hewa (2009)
Gamel (2013)
Nijimusi (2019)

OLAibi

Humming Moon Drip (2006)

Saicobab

Sab Se Purani Bab (2017)

Z-Rock Hawaii

Z-Rock Hawaii (1996)

References

External links

77 Boadrum Site Profile Viva Radio, Sep 2007.  (Flash)
http://www.ooioo.jp/ Official Website 

Japanese women musicians
Japanese musicians
Living people
Women drummers
1968 births
Musicians from Okayama Prefecture
Japanese women in electronic music
Boredoms members
Free Kitten members